Rhodes Whitmore Fairbridge (21 May 1914 – 8 November 2006) was an Australian geologist and expert on climate change. His father was Kingsley Fairbridge.

Born in Pinjarra, Western Australia, Fairbridge graduated from Queen's University in Ontario and earned his master's degree from Oxford. In 1941, he earned a doctorate in geology from the University of Western Australia.

He taught at Columbia University from 1955 until his 1982 retirement. While there, he was supervising editor for the Encyclopedia of Earth Sciences. In the early 1960s, he developed the so-called "Fairbridge Curve", a record of changes in sea levels over the last 10,000 years. In the 1980s Fairbridge wrote about climate's impact on the long-term evolution of shields and peneplains.

Fairbridge died in 2006 in Amagansett, New York of a brain tumor.

Works
 The Encyclopedia of Oceanography edited (Reinhold Pub. Co., 1966)
 The Encyclopedia of Geochemistry and Environmental Sciences edited (Reinhold Pub. Corp., 1967)
 The Encyclopedia of Geomorphology edited (Reinhold Book Corp., c1968)
 Climate : History, Periodicity, and Predictability (Van Nostrand Reinhold, c1987)
 The Encyclopedia of Climatology edited with John E. Oliver (Van Nostrand Reinhold, c1987)
 The Physiographic Regions of Australia co-written with J. Gentilli  (University of Western Australia, 19--)

References

1914 births
2006 deaths
Australian geomorphologists
20th-century Australian geologists
Australian academics
20th-century Australian non-fiction writers
Deaths from brain cancer in the United States
People from Pinjarra, Western Australia
University of Western Australia alumni
Columbia University faculty